The 2005 season was São Paulo's 76th season since club's existence. In this season Tricolor won the Campeonato Paulista, league of State of São Paulo for the 21st time and the continental cup, Copa Libertadores de America, beating Atlético Paranaense in the first final with teams from the same country of tournament history, winning by 4–0 in the second match, 5–1 in aggregate. The continental title enabled São Paulo to participate of FIFA Club World Championship in the end of season when the club became a world champion for the third time (2 Intercontinental Cups), defeating the English club, European champions Liverpool in the final with a single goal scored by Mineiro in the 27th minute of first time. In the Campeonato Brasileiro São Paulo finished in 11th position and was eliminated by Internacional in first round of Copa Sudamericana.

Squad

Final squad

Competitions

Overall

{|class="wikitable"
|-
|Games played || 79 (19 Campeonato Paulista, 14 Copa Libertadores, 42 Campeonato Brasileiro, 2 Copa Sudamericana, 2 Club World Cup )
|-
|Games won || 41 (14 Campeonato Paulista, 9 Copa Libertadores, 16 Campeonato Brasileiro, 0 Copa Sudamericana, 2 Club World Cup)
|-
|Games drawn || 18 (3 Campeonato Paulista, 4 Copa Libertadores, 10 Campeonato Brasileiro, 1 Copa Sudamericana, 0 Club World Cup)
|-
|Games lost || 20 (2 Campeonato Paulista, 1 Copa Libertadores, 16 Campeonato Brasileiro, 1 Copa Sudamericana, 0 Club World Cup)
|-
|Goals scored || 166
|-
|Goals conceded || 107
|-
|Goal difference || +59
|-
|Best result || 6–0 (H) v Marília – Campeonato Paulista – 2005.3.19 
|-
|Worst result || 0–3 (A) v Internacional – Campeonato Brasileiro – 2005.10.50–3 (A) v Goiás – Campeonato Brasileiro – 2005.11.16
|-
|Top scorer || Rogério Ceni (21 goals)
|-

Scorers

Managers performance

Official competitions

Campeonato Paulista

Record

Copa Libertadores

Record

Campeonato Brasileiro

Rescheduled matches

Round 10

Round 24

Record

Copa Sudamericana

Record

FIFA Club World Championship

Record

See also
São Paulo FC

References

External links
official website 

Brazilian football clubs 2005 season
2005
2005